ARMOR is the professional journal of the U.S. Army’s Armor Branch, published by the Chief of Armor at Fort Benning, Georgia, training center for the Army's tank and cavalry forces (United States Army Armor School). ARMOR magazine is the U.S. Army's oldest professional journal, founded by U.S. Cavalry officers in 1888, and originally titled as The Cavalry Journal.

History
The Cavalry Journal was originally created by Cavalry officers on the American frontier as a forum for discussing doctrine, tactics and equipment among soldiers geographically separated by the great distances of the American West. With the creation of the U.S. armored forces in 1940, The Cavalry Journal was renamed to Armor, the Magazine of Mobile Warfare. Prior to 1974, the Armor Association, a private organization, published the magazine, but the U.S. Army Armor School began publishing ARMOR as of the March-April 1974 edition. The publication is now a professional bulletin published under the authority of Army Regulation 25–30. Its current name is ARMOR, subtitled Mounted Maneuver Journal.

See also
 Field Artillery (magazine)
 Infantry (magazine)

Notes

References
Zaloga, Steven J. Armored Thunderbolt; The US Army Sherman in World War II. Mechanicsville, PA (USA): Stackpole Books.  .

External links
 Alternate download location

Quarterly magazines published in the United States
Magazines established in 1888
Magazines published in Georgia (U.S. state)
Military magazines published in the United States
1888 establishments in the United States
United States Army Training and Doctrine Command
Tanks of the United States